The 2008 Israel–Hezbollah prisoner exchange took place on 16 July 2008 when Hezbollah transferred the coffins of two Israeli soldiers in exchange for 5 Lebanese militants held by Israel as well as the bodies of 199 militants captured in Lebanon or Israel.

Exchange

Hezbollah released the remains of two captured Israeli soldiers Ehud Goldwasser and Eldad Regev. In exchange, Israel returned Palestine Liberation Front militant Samir Kuntar, who was convicted of murder in Israel, Nasim Nisr, a Lebanese man of Jewish heritage who had immigrated to Israel and spied for Hezbollah, and Mahir Kourani, Mohammad Surour, Hussain Sulaiman and Khadr Zaidan, four Hezbollah militants taken prisoner by Israel in the 2006 Lebanon War. Israel also returned the remains of about 200 Lebanese and Palestinian militants killed whose bodies had been brought to Israel and buried there. Eight of these were Hezbollah fighters killed in the 2006 war.

It has long been the general policy of Israel not to return the remains of killed militants that had engaged in "hostile terrorist activity" to their families for burial. The exchange deal was carried out in accordance with the Red Cross and UN observers. On 1 June 2008, Israel released the Lebanese prisoner Nissim Nasser in exchange for the remains of Israeli soldiers killed during the 2006 war.

In October 2007, Israel and Hezbollah agreed to exchange a civilian Hezbollah member kidnapped in 2006 and the remains of two Hezbollah fighters killed and brought to Israel for the remains of Gabriel Dwait, an Israeli resident who drowned and washed ashore in Lebanon. The released prisoner was 50-year-old Hassan Naim Aqil, a former Hezbollah guerrilla who did not fight in the Second Lebanon War.

Reactions
Although news of Kuntar's release was met with celebration at a Hezbollah rally in Beirut, Lebanon, Israeli experts believe that the majority of Lebanese people were not pleased with this exchange. The reason for this is because they see this as a victory for Hezbollah, whom they see as an enemy. In Gaza City, many Palestinians celebrated the news of the exchange by handing out sweets.

Israel's deputy foreign minister, Majalli Wehbi, called the Beirut celebrations "shameful", stating that "Kuntar's fans laud a man who prides himself on smashing a child's skull". The foreign ministry also released a public diplomacy video in Arabic claiming Israel's moral victory in the swap.

There was a mixed reaction worldwide, with many American news outlets criticizing the release of Kuntar and condemning the way he was praised in Lebanon.

See also
Israeli prisoner exchanges

References

External links
 Prisoner Exchange: Saying goodbye to Udi, Eldad Ynetnews

2006 Lebanon War
2008 in Israel
2008 in Lebanon
Israeli prisoner exchanges
Iran–Israel proxy conflict
Hezbollah–Israel conflict
Israeli–Lebanese conflict